Mount Sir Sandford is the highest mountain of the Sir Sandford Range and the highest mountain in the Selkirk Mountains of southeastern British Columbia, Canada. It is the 12th highest peak in the province. The mountain was named after Sir Sandford Fleming, a railway engineer for the Canadian Pacific Railway.

The mountain was first summited in 1912 after several attempts in prior years by a party of four, led by Edward W. D. Holway and including Howard Palmer, Edward Feuz Jr. and Rudolph Aemmer.

See also
 Mountain peaks of Canada
 List of mountain peaks of North America

References

External links

 "Mount Sir Sandford, British Columbia" on Peakbagger
 Mount Sir Sandford aerial photo: PBase

Three-thousanders of British Columbia
Big Bend Ranges
Columbia Country
Kootenay Land District